Petrovka is a rural locality (a selo) in Zilairsky Selsoviet, Zilairsky District, Bashkortostan, Russia. The population was 147 as of 2010. There are 6 streets.

Geography 
Petrovka is located 16 km north of Zilair (the district's administrative centre) by road. Zilair is the nearest rural locality.

References 

Rural localities in Zilairsky District